Marcel Rué (21 November 1926 – 9 August 2017) was a Monegasque sports shooter. He competed at the 1952 Summer Olympics, 1960 Summer Olympics and 1976 Summer Olympics.

References

1926 births
2017 deaths
Monegasque male sport shooters
Olympic shooters of Monaco
Shooters at the 1952 Summer Olympics
Shooters at the 1960 Summer Olympics
Shooters at the 1976 Summer Olympics